Hamid Hedayati (born March 11, 1976) is an Iranian football player who currently plays for Rah Ahan of the Iran Pro League.

Club career
Hedayati joined Paykan F.C. in 2008 after spending the previous season at Payam Mashhad F.C. in the Azadegan League

Club career statistics

 Assist Goals

References

1976 births
Living people
Iranian footballers
Paykan F.C. players
Pas players
Payam Mashhad players
Rah Ahan players
Association football midfielders